Zhou Shen (born ), also known as Charlie Zhou, is a Chinese singer known for his ethereal voice and wide vocal range, capable of singing soprano. He is best known for his song "Big Fish", which has won 8 awards. In November 2017, Zhou released his debut album Charlie's Debut Album, a co-creation with producer Gao Xiaosong, songwriter Yin Yue, and composer Qian Lei. He has performed songs for many largescale Chinese films and TV series, including Big Fish & Begonia, Dahufa, and Jiang Ziya, among many others.

Zhou's first series of concerts, 深空间, were held in May and June 2018, as well as January, June and July 2019. His second series concert tour, Planet C-929, started in November 2019, with stops at Beijing, Nanjing, Shenzhen, Chongqing, Chengdu, Shanghai, and Guangzhou. In July 2020, Zhou Shen held the online concert "Good Night, See You Tomorrow" on TME live that streamed on multiple platforms, among which QQ Music was watched online by more than 7.2 million viewers. In August 2022, he held the online concert "I want to be by your side" (想到你“深”边) on Douyin, the livestream of which had over 140 million viewers.

He won the MTV Europe Music Award for Best Greater China Act in November 2019. In August 2020, he ranked 42nd in the Forbes China Celebrity List of 2020.

Early life 
Zhou was born in Shaoyang, Hunan and later moved to Guiyang, Guizhou with his parents during second grade of primary school. He was later admitted to Guiyang No. 6 High School. After graduating from high school, he went to Ukraine to study dentistry because tuition costs were cheaper there. However, after one year, he made the decision to transfer to Lviv National Musical Academy to study Bel canto instead.

Career

2010: Pre-debut 
Zhou's career began in 2010, when he began singing online on a Chinese video-based social network, YY.com, using his nickname "卡布叻."

2014–2015: Participation in The Voice of China 
Zhou participated in The Voice of China (season 3). He gained recognition from the coaches by singing "HuanYan" ("Smiling Face") from Chyi Yu in the blind audition round. The song "Lake Baikal" sung by Zhou and Li Wei in the contest was awarded Song of 2014 of The Voice of China. In the same year, Zhou participated in the live tour of The Voice.

He attended Beijing TV's New Year's Gala and supported the bid for the Olympic Winter Games in Beijing by singing a multi-language version of "Let It Go". He also participated in the world tour of the performing-arts extravaganza Cultures of China, Festival of Spring. In May, Zhou went to London to attend The Voice UK with Li Wei on behalf of The Voice of China. He then released a cover album called Aftertaste together with Li Wei in July. After that, Zhou's first single, "The Rose and the Deer", was released, and he won the Best New Artist of ERC Chinese Top Ten Awards.

2016: Rise to fame 
In May 2016, Zhou sang "Big Fish" for the Chinese animated film Big Fish & Begonia, and "Early Rain in Lin-an" for the online game Water Margin Q. "Big Fish" and "The Rose and the Deer." Both songs were selected as part of the Top 10 Hits Songs of Fresh Asia Music Award 2016. In October, Zhou sang several songs on the music show Mask Singer, in which he gained further recognition. He also won the Most Popular Male Singer Online of Music Pioneer Award 2016.

2017: Debut album 
Zhou performed "Echo" for the TV series The Starry Night The Starry Sea. His song "Big Fish" won the Top 10 Songs of the Year and honoured him with the People's Choice Male Singer of ERC Chinese Top Ten Awards 2017. In June, he sang "Calm Romance" for the Chinese film Brotherhood of Blades II: The Infernal Battlefield and "Speechless" for the Chinese animation Dahufa (The Guardian). He sang the ending song "Vicissitudes of Life" for the TV series The Starry Night The Starry Sea Second. His debut album, Charlie's Debut Album, was released in November 2017.

2018: First concert tour 

Zhou sang the Chinese promotional song for the 2017 film The Shape of Water. He won the Most Improved Artist of ERC Chinese Top Ten Awards 2018 and held his first series of concerts at Shanghai, Wuhan, and Chengdu. Zhou released the promotional song "Irrelevant" for another film, A or B. He won the Most Popular Karaoke MV of the China Music Awards and the Best New Artist of the Global Chinese Music Chart Awards. His title track "Blue Parachute" was selected as the Top Songs of 2018. In November, Zhou performed classical songs like "Time to Say Goodbye", "Memory", "Think of Me", "The Lonely Goatherd" in the musical show Super–Vocal and received high praise from both the audience and the judges. He participated in The Masked Singer (season 3), his second appearance in Masked Singer, this time using his Bel canto skill and versatile vocals to mislead the guessing panel.

2019: Second concert tour and awards 
Zhou performed "With the Wind" for the TV series Mystery of Antiques. A non-official song called "Never Say Goodbye", sung with Liao Changyong and other members of Super–Vocal, was released in January. In March, Zhou sang "Only You" for the TV series Relying on Heaven to Slaughter Dragons. He got awarded Breakthrough Artist of the Year and the song "Blossom" won the Top 10 Songs of the Year from ERC Chinese Top Ten Awards 2019. He also started his second series of concerts in Beijing in January, followed by Shenzhen and Hangzhou in June and July. In April, along with other Super–Vocal members, Zhou joined the 'Super–Vocal' and 'Never Say Goodbye' concert tour. He also held a joint music concert, 深龄其境, with Isabelle Huang in Shanghai on 18 May. On 25 May, he attended Victor Wong's "The Pursuit of Happiness" concert in Beijing as a special guest. On 6 June, Zhou was invited to the award ceremony of the 17th Vision Youth Awards. He received the Campus Popularity Award for Performing Artists on CNR Music Radio Top Music Awards on 8 June. On 12 June, he attended the Nanyang Khek Community Gift of Warmth Charity Concert 2019, a charity concert in Singapore, to offer warmth to people with autism, together with Chyi Yu, Huang Hongying, and Roy Li Fei Huei. In the concert, Zhou performed seven of his own singles and another Hakka song, "When Hakkas Meet in Singapore", as well as a duet with Chyi Yu on an English song "Mother of Mine". In October 2019, Zhou was ranked on the music industry list of Forbes 30 Under 30 China 2019. On the 1 and 2 November 2019, he participated in the Nanjing The Untamed music concert and sang the song "Huang Cheng Du (Passing By the Deserted City)". In November 2019, he won the MTV Europe Music Award for Best Greater China Act. From November 2019 to January 2020, he held his second concert tour, named Planet C-929, with stops in Beijing, Nanjing, Suzhou, Chengdu, Shanghai, and Guangzhou.

2020: Participation in variety shows, end of contract with The Voice of Dreams, first online concert 
From October 2019 to January 2020, Zhou participated in the music program Our Song broadcast by Dragon TV, where his performances and comedic interactions with his senior partner, cantopop legend Hacken Lee, widely contributed to the popularity of the show. From January to April 2020, he participated in the cultural reality show The Great Wall which educated viewers about the history and culture of the Great Wall of China.

Zhou was one of the initial singers on Singer 2020, which was broadcast on Hunan TV from February to April 2020. Throughout the competition, Zhou was one of the most consistently high ranking contestants, and won first place in episode 8 for his performance of the song "Da La Beng Ba", in which he blended singing with voice acting, using 5 different voices in his dynamic performance. This performance proceeded to go viral on Chinese platforms, quickly exceeding 10 million views on Bilibili alone and surpassing the view count of the original song. After his cover of the song was released on Netease Cloud Music, it dominated the chart for several days, having been played over 100 million times and remaining on trending on Chinese search engines. This version has also been widely praised by China's domestic music critics, citing how Zhou Shen's integration of ACGN style (including his mashup with "Gokuraku Jodo"), pop music, and bel canto in his songs has contributed to the spread of ACGN culture.

As Zhou gained widespread recognition in 2020, he also appeared as a guest in many largescale variety shows, including Day Day Up, Ace vs Ace, Back to Field, Smoothly Flowing Melodies, and Keep Running! (season 8). Zhou later participated in the variety show Youth Periplous II as a member of the 'Spring Outing Family' (春游家族).

Zhou appeared in some e-commerce live streams after becoming the Brand Spokesperson of the Oriental Therapy (东方季道), which belongs to The Procter & Gamble Company. Due to the COVID-19 pandemic, the People's Daily, China Movie Channel New Media Center, and social media platform Sina Weibo co-launched the Hello Future "Graduation Song 2020" Cloud Concert (未来你好"毕业歌2020"云演唱会) on 28 June 2020. Many filmmakers and musicians, including Zhou, sent their best wishes through songs or speeches to 77 college graduates via the online commencement.

On 19 July 2020, the establishment of Zhou Shen Studios was officially announced after his six year contract with The Voice of Dreams ended. His first online concert "Good Night, See You Tomorrow" was then held on 25 July, on the 6th anniversary of his debut.

In 2020, Zhou collaborated several times with internationally renowned pianist Lang Lang, performing "Interstellar Train" with the band "The Tropical Depression" on the TV program The Coming One: SUPER BAND as well as "Big Fish" & "Scarborough Fair" in Jiangsu TV's Kuaishou "One Thousand and One Nights" (江苏卫视快手一千零一夜) Gala on 30 October. On 16 October, Zhou also collaborated with renowned Mongolian singer Tengger to perform "The Heaven of Big Fish" (大鱼的天堂), a mashup of "Big Fish" and "Tiantang", on the TikTok x Zhejiang TV Autumn Gala 2020 (抖音美好奇妙夜x浙江卫视秋季盛典2020).

From August to November 2020, Zhou appeared on the variety show Go Newbies, in which he learned how to drive and obtained his driving license.

Starting from 4 November, Zhou Shen appeared in a workplace-observational reality show An Exciting Offer Season 2 along with other 'cheering group' (加油团) members, including He Jiong, Benny Sa, and Fan Chengcheng.

On 31 December, Zhou Shen was invited to perform on multiple New Year's Eve concerts, including China Media Group's 2021 New Year Gala--"Set Sail, 2021" (启航2021—中央广播电视总台跨年盛典),> Jiangsu TV 2021 New Year Countdown Concert (江苏卫视2021跨年演唱会), Bilibili New Year's Eve Gala 2020 (Bilibili "2020最美的夜"跨年晚会)
 and "Welcoming Olympic Winter Games" BTV(Beijing Media Network) 2021 New Year Global Gala (2021迎冬奥相约北京BRTV环球跨年冰雪盛典) and Guangdong TV 2020-2021 "Passing on Joy in Beautiful Life" New Year Celebration (广东卫视2020-2021"美好生活欢乐送"跨年特别节目). He is also one of the referrers for the release of the Paralympic Winter Games and the Olympic Winter Games Beijing 2020 Sport Pictogram (北京冬奥会及冬残奥会体育图标).

Awards and Accolades 
On 17 January, Zhou Shen was awarded with Top 10 Mainland Artists, Top 10 Popular Songs, Top 10 Anime Songs, Top 10 Film Songs in 2019 QQ Music Year-End Charts. In the 2019 Digital Music Report of China launched by Tencent Music Entertainment on 23 March, Zhou Shen won nine awards, including Top 10 Singers of the Year and Popular Songs Top 10 Singers of the Year. In June, Zhou won three awards at Sina Entertainment Grand Ceremony, including Most Popular Variety Show Guests, Top 10 Music Production "Ring the Doorbell, Listen by Yourself", and Top 3 of the Most Popular Live Stage "Da La Beng Ba". He attended the ERC Chinese Top Ten Music Awards on 19 July and won three awards, including Best Film/TV OST Singer of the Year, Media Recommend Singer, and Top 10 Songs of the Year "Flow with the Wind". In August, he ranked 42nd in the Forbes China Celebrity List of 2020. In September, Zhou won three awards of Global Chinese Golden Chart Awards, including Best Love Song Performance of the Year, Media Recommend Male Singer of the Year, Fairchild Radio Recommend Singer. On 20 December, Zhou was awarded Tencent Video The Most Popular Singer of 2020 at Tencent Video All-Stars Night 2020 Awards Ceremony, and 2020 Most Popular Chinese Artist of the Year 2020 and Super Idol of the Year of 2020 NetEase Annual Music Awards on 22 December. His performing song "Da La Beng Ba" was also awarded the 2020 Most Popular Song of the Year in the category of Most Popular Single and Most Popular Show Performance.

2021: First appearance on CCTV's Spring Festival Gala (春晚) 
Zhou Shen appeared on the cultural urban travel documentary Marvelous City presented by Youku on 5 January to introduce the city where he grew up--Guiyang. Since 6 November 2020, Zhou Shen has been the official Promotion Ambassador of Guiyang Cultural Tourism (贵阳文化旅游推广大使)

On 8 January, Zhou Shen was awarded The Most Popular Singer of 2020 by Tencent Entertainment White Paper (腾讯娱乐白皮书) on 2020 Tencent Entertainment Annual Grand Ceremony (2020腾讯娱乐年度盛典). On 19 January, Zhou Shen was awarded Top 10 Singers of the Year and Popular Songs Top 10 Singers of the Year in the Uni Chart Annual Review 2020 (2020由你音乐榜年度盘点). On 22 January, Zhou Shen won Musician of the Year and the Most-Viewed Uploader of the Year from Bilibili Music Awards 2020 (2020年度bilibili音乐大盘点). On the same day, he won the QQ Music Year-End Charts 2020 (QQ音乐巅峰榜2020年终榜单) of the Top 10 Artists of the Year and his live song "The Wind Rises" won the Top 10 Singles of the Year. On 23 January, he won the Best Mainland Male Singer of the Year from Tencent Music Entertainment Awards 2020 (腾讯音乐娱乐盛典), and his song “The Upside” also won Top 10 Songs of the Year.

On 27 January, Zhou Shen was announced as a mentor for the Tencent's talent show Chuang 2021. His cover of a famous Ukrainian pop song "Річка" in the show with Ukrainian trainee Andy was broadcast on several different international news media.

During the 2021 Lunar New Year, Zhou Shen was invited to many different festival galas, including CCTV Spring Festival Gala Evening (中央电视台春节联欢晚会), China Media Group - The Night of "Straight to CCTV Spring Festival Gala" (中国广播电视总台 直通春晚《直通之夜》), Tencent Family New Year's Eve Dinner FAN Party (家族年年年夜FAN), A Worldwide Celebration: Chinese New Year 2021 by Hunan TV (湖南卫视2021全球华侨华人春节大联欢), Jiangsu TV 2021 Spring Festival Gala Evening (江苏卫视2021春节联欢晚会), and CCTV 2021 Lantern Festival Gala (中央电视台元宵晚会). Most notably, he made his first appearance on CCTV's "CCTV New Year's Gala", performing "China in the Lights" (灯火里的中国) with singer Zhang Ye. This performance was critically acclaimed by both domestic and overseas audiences, and exceeded 100 million views cumulatively across Chinese video platforms the day after it aired.

In March and April, Zhou Shen served as the Bravo "Go-Online" Officer (华彩上线官) of the Bravo Youngsters! The Colorful Boy was broadcast on CCTV-1. On 13 March, He participated in the 2021 Television Series of China Quality Ceremony(2021电视剧品质盛典), and won the Highest Quality OST of the Year award for his song Soften the Glare, Unify as Dust (和光同尘). He also performed the song during the ceremony with Wang Kai. On 9 April, Zhou Shen participated in the Global Diplomats’ Chinese Cultural Night (全球外交官中国文化之夜), where he won the 2020 Most Influential Youth Singer of the Year award sang You Raise Me Up, which captivated audiences internationally.

On 25 May, Zhou Shen collaborated with world-renowned composer and conductor Tan Dun in the Nanshan Pop Festival 2021 (2021南山流行音乐节), singing a solo of A Love Before Time (月光爱人), Only For Love (我用所有报答爱) and Big Fish. On 31 May, as the Dream Ambassador of "Art in Action" by Tecent & Hefeng (腾讯荷风艺术行动), he participated in the public welfare project "Childhood on the Ridge of Field", and sang the theme song May Wind Over the Wheat Field Ridges (田埂五月风). On 12 June, he participated in the Baidu "China Chic" Grand Ceremony (百度“潮”盛典), broadcast on Zhejiang Satellite TV, and sang an arrangement of a mashup of classic Chinese animation theme songs, including his own OSTs Big Fish from Big Fish and Begonia and Not Speaking (不说话) from Dahufa.

Discography

Studio albums 
 Charlie's Debut Album (2017)

Cover albums 
 回味 Aftertaste (2015)

Live albums

Singles

Variety shows

Product endorsements

Tours

Awards

References

External links 

 Zhou Shen on Weibo
 Zhou Shen Studio
 Zhou Shen on Bilibili

Zhou Shen
1992 births
Living people
21st-century Chinese male singers
Boy sopranos
Chinese Mandopop singers
MTV Europe Music Award winners